Born Free is a 1966 film directed by James Hill. It may also refer to:

Born Free may also refer to:

Music 
 "Born Free" (Matt Monro song), a 1966 composition by John Barry and Don Black for the film
 Born Free (Andy Williams album), featuring the above song
 Born Free (Milt Jackson album), featuring the above song
 "Born Free" (M.I.A. song), a 2010 song by M.I.A.
 Born Free (music video), the music video/short film
 Born Free (Kid Rock album), a 2010 album by Kid Rock
 "Born Free" (Kid Rock song), featured in the above album
 Born Free (Humble Gods album), 2004

Television 
 Born Free (TV series), a 1974 television series based on the film
 Kyōryū Tankentai (Dinosaur Exploration Team) Born Free, a 1976 anime series by Sunrise and Tsuburaya Productions unrelated to the above series, movie, or book. Released by Celebrity Home Entertainment as an English-dubbed compilation film entitled "Return of the Dinosaurs".
 "Born Free" (Dexter), a 2006 episode of the television series Dexter

Other uses 
 Born Free (book), a 1960 nonfiction book by Joy Adamson upon which the film was based
 Born Free Foundation, a UK-based charitable organisation named after the film